Luz del Alba Jiménez (born February 16, 1992 in Santo Domingo) is a Dominican politician. She was the Minister for Youth of the Dominican Republic. Jiménez was appointed Minister of Youth by President Luis Abinader on December 9, 2020 and was in office till December 5, 2021. She previously served as the Deputy Minister of Planning and Development for the Ministry of Youth. She is the third woman to be appointed Minister of Youth.

She is a member of the Modern Revolutionary Party.

Scandal 
On November 8, 2021 Luz del Alba Jiménez was accused of orchestrating acts of corruption by wanting to benefit from two companies called Gretmon and SketchProm worth 3 million pesos. In March 2021, a special report revealed that Jimenez's parents, siblings and other relatives were on the payroll of the Community Higher Technical Institute (ITSC).

References 

1992 births
Living people